is a Japanese superhero featured in a successful series of serial-like tokusatsu short feature films produced between 1957 and 1959 by Shintoho (the non-union branch of Toho).

Japan's first onscreen superhero
Whereas Takeo Nagamatsu's 1930 kamishibai The Golden Bat (Ōgon Batto) was Japan's first modern superhero (and had many manga, anime and film adaptations), Shintoho's Super Giant was the first celluloid superhero (theatrically released in 1957), and the role model for many Japanese superheroes to come, especially Ultraman and Kamen Rider.
  
Named "Super Giants" (plural), although the main character was only one person and obviously human-sized, the series' title was no doubt inspired by the American Adventures of Superman (which was then being broadcast in Japan) and the famous Japanese baseball team, the Yomiuri Giants (who were extremely popular at the time).

Moonlight Mask (Gekkō Kamen) became Japan's first made-for-television superhero when his TV show debuted in 1958, but Super Giant was Japan's first theatrical superhero series.

Character background
Super Giant is a human-like being created from the strongest steel by the Peace Council of the Emerald Planet.  He is created to destroy evil and restore peace in the universe.  Resembling a Japanese man in white tights/cowl (fitted with an antenna) and capes under his arms, he is virtually indestructible.  He wears on his wrist a "Globe-Meter" device, which enables him to:
Fly through space
Detect radiation
Speak and understand any language
He can also use it to disguise himself as an Earthling to walk among them.  When sent to Earth to fight evildoers, he disguises himself as a Japanese man wearing an ordinary suit and fedora hat (looking almost like a police detective), but still uses his "Super Giant" name.  His secret identity is not that secret, as he works with the Japanese authorities to help them fight evildoers. He is just as powerful in his civilian form. He also gets along with Earth children, and saves them from danger, as he knows that children represent the Earth's future. After accomplishing his mission, Super Giant always flies back to the Emerald Planet.

Super Giant was played in all nine films by respected film/TV actor Ken Utsui.  However, Utsui hated playing Super Giant and, right up to his death, always played down the role. This was partially on account of the somewhat embarrassing costume, especially the overstuffed crotch area (he said the producers thought that female viewers were attracted to well-endowed men, so they stuffed the crotch area of Utsui's costume with cotton). Whatever Utsui's feelings about the role, his earnest and heroic interpretation of the character made lasting impact on a generation's children all over the world.

Films

Super Giant 

Super Giant (スーパー・ジャイアンツ 鋼鉄の巨人, Sūpā Jaiantsu) a.k.a. The Steel Giant, is a 1957 black and white Japanese film directed by Teruo Ishii.

Plot: Super Giant first appears on Earth to stop foreign terrorists who threaten to destroy Japan (and the rest of the world) with an atomic bomb. (Part 1 of 2).

This film is part of the U.S. version Atomic Rulers of the World.

Actors in the film include:
 Ken Utsui as Super Giant
 Junko Ikeuchi
 Minoru Takada
 Ryo Iwashita
 Minako Yamada
 Utako Mitsuya as Kaoru
 Shōji Nakayama
 Jōji Ōhara

Super Giant 2 

Super Giant Continues (続スーパー・ジャイアンツ 続鋼鉄の巨人, Zoku Sūpā Jaiantsu) is a 1957 black and white Japanese film directed by Teruo Ishii.

Plot: Super Giant continues his battle against the foreign terrorists. In return, they frame him for murder. (Part 2 of 2)

This film is part of the U.S. version Atomic Rulers of the World.

Cast:
Ken Utsui as Super Giant
Utako Mitsuya as Kaoru Yamanaka
Shoji Nakayama as Detective Okamoto
Junko Ikeuchi as Toshiko
Takashi Yamaguchi as Minister of Justice

Super Giant 3 

Super Giant - The Mysterious Spacemen's Demonic Castle (スーパー・ジャイアンツ 怪星人の魔城 - Sūpā Jaiantsu - Kaiseijin no Majō) is a 1957 black and white Japanese film directed by Teruo Ishii.

Plot: The reptile-like Kapia-Seijin prepare to conquer the Earth, and Super Giant must stop them. (Part 1 of 2).

This film is part of the U.S. version Invaders from Space.

Cast:
Ken Utsui as Super Giant
Masao Takamatsu
Akira Nakamura
Hiroshi Asami
Kotaro Sugiyama
Fujie Satsuki
Ryuji Shima
Yukio Obama
Yukio Sayama
Hiroshi Maki
Daijiro Kikukawa
Toru Chiba
Shinji Suzuki

Trivia: The Kapia-Seijin are based on the Japanese mythical creatures known as kappa (water imps).

Super Giant 4 

Super Giant - Earth on the Verge of Destruction (スーパー・ジャイアンツ 地球滅亡寸前 - Sūpā Jaiantsu - Chikyū Metsubō Sunzen) is a 1957 black and white Japanese film directed by Teruo Ishii.

Plot: Super Giant continues his battle against the Kapia-Seijin, who not only send a mysterious witch after a group of children, but summon their almighty leader to alter Earth's rotation. (Part 2 of 2).

This film is part of the U.S. version Invaders from Space.

Super Giant 5 

Super Giant - The Artificial Satellite and the Destruction of Humanity (スーパー・ジャイアンツ 人工衛星と人類の破滅  - Sūpā Jaiantsu - Jinkō Eisei to Jinrui no Hametsu) is a 1957 Japanese film directed by Teruo Ishii.

Plot: Super Giant pursues a Nazi-like army that operates on a huge satellite in space.  The satellite is armed with weapons that could destroy whole cities on Earth from afar. (Part 1 of 2)

This film is part of the U.S. version Attack from Space.

Super Giant 6 

Super Giant - The Spaceship and the Clash of the Artificial Satellite (スーパー・ジャイアンツ 宇宙艇と人工衛星の激突 - Sūpā Jaiantsu - Uchūtei to Jinkō Eisei no Gekitotsu) is a 1958 black and white Japanese film directed by Teruo Ishii.

Plot: Although he was believed to be destroyed by the Nazi-like army, Super Giant breaks into the satellite, and a long, riotous battle ensues. (Part 2 of 2)

This film is part of the U.S. version Attack from Space.

Trivia: It was after this film was made that director Teruo Ishii left the series, upon hearing of a child who imitated Super Giant (even wearing a hand-made cape) by jumping out of a window and landing on the street below, seriously injuring himself. This became a controversial liability issue with Japanese superhero programs (not unlike those in America), until shows like Android Kikaider (1972) added a safety bumper at the end of each episode, telling children not to imitate the impossible feats performed by the title superhero.

This was the last Super Giant film with a two-part story arc; the remaining films were stand-alone episodes, and none of them from this point on were directed by Teruo Ishii.

Super Giant 7 

Super Giant - The Space Mutant Appears (スーパー・ジャイアンツ 宇宙怪人出現 - Sūpā  Jaiantsu - Uchū Kaijin Shutsugen) is a 1958 black and white Japanese film directed by Akira Mitsuwa.

Plot: Super Giant battles a marauding alien brain-like creature created by a mad scientist and an alien army. (stand-alone episode)

This film is part of the U.S. version Evil Brain from Outer Space.

Cast:
Ken Utsui as Super Giant
Akira Nakamura as Dr. Sakurai
Tomohiko Otani as Dr. Kurokawa
Hiroshi Asami as Minoru Kawada
Den Kunikata as Detective Okamoto
Hiroshi Maki as Policeman A
Kyoji Murayama as Policeman B
Masao Takamatsu as Yamanaka, Prime Minister
Yoshijuro Suzuki as Satomi, Minister of Justice
Hiroshi Maki as Space Mutant A
Ryuji Shima as Space Mutant B

Trivia: The last Super Giant film shot in fullscreen.

Super Giant 8 

Super Giant Continues - The Devil's Incarnation (続スーパー・ジャイアンツ 悪魔の化身 - Zoku Sūpā  Jaiantsu - Akuma no Keshin) is a 1959 Color/Scope Japanese film directed by Chogi Akasaka.

Plot: Super Giant copes with a mad scientist (disfigured in World War II) who uses science and sorcery to turn his deceased daughter into an evil witch that murders women. (stand-alone episode)

This film is part of the U.S. version Evil Brain from Outer Space. Despite the fact it was filmed in color and Scope, footage from this episode was incorporated into the English-language film, converted to black and white. Evil Brain from Outer Space contains sequences featuring both the disfigured scientist and the witch creature. To fit within the US versions story arc, the witch is described as another "mutant".

Trivia: The only Super Giant film made in both color and widescreen (2.35:1).

Super Giant 9 

Super Giant Continues - Kingdom of the Poison Moth (続スーパー・ジャイアンツ 毒蛾王国 - Zoku Sūpā  Jaiantsu - Dokuga Ōkoku) is a 1959 black and white widescreen Japanese film directed by Chogi Akasaka.

Plot: Super Giant fights against an Arab terrorist army (who wear costumes that look similar to the aliens' costumes in The Space Mutant Appears) which plots to assassinate its nation's peaceful crown prince for his treasure. (stand-alone episode)

This film is part of the U.S. version Evil Brain from Outer Space.

Manga adaptations
Towards the end of the film series' run, there were manga adaptations of the Super Giant adventures.  Artists included Tatsuo Yoshida and Jiro Kuwata.

American adaptations
The American company Walter Manley Enterprises  purchased the international rights to Super Giant and with Medallion Films, repackaged the nine films into four films for U.S. television under the name Starman in 1964.

The first six installments were re-edited into three films -- Atomic Rulers of the World, Invaders from Space, and Attack from Space. The final three Japanese films were all re-edited into Evil Brain from Outer Space. The English dubbing was handled by Titra Studios of New York, using many of the voices common in dubbed films of the time, including Peter Fernandez. The original music soundtrack was largely replaced by library tracks.

References

Sources
Ragone, August. THE ORIGINAL "STARMAN"; the Forgotten Supergiant of Steel Who Fought for Peace, Justice and the Japanese Way. Originally published in Planet X Magazine, included as extras (DVD written articles) on both volumes of Something Weird Video's two-volume DVD release of the four American versions of Starman (the first half was on Volume 1 and the second half on Volume 2).

External links

US syndications

Tokusatsu
Short film series
Super Giant films
Japanese science fiction films
Film superheroes
Film series introduced in 1957
1950s Japanese films